Over the Top is a 1918 American silent war film directed by Wilfrid North and starring Arthur Guy Empey, Lois Meredith and James W. Morrison. The film is based on a book of the same name by Empey, detailing his service as an American volunteer with the British Army on the Western Front. Location shooting for the trench scenes took place at Camp Wheeler in Georgia.

President Woodrow Wilson attended the Washington premiere along with his wife and a number of cabinet members.

Cast
 Arthur Guy Empey as Sergeant James Garrison 'Garry' Owen 
 Lois Meredith as Helen Lloyd 
 James W. Morrison as Albert Lloyd 
 Arthur Donaldson as Friederich von Emden 
 Julia Swayne Gordon as Mrs. Wagner 
 Mary Maurice as Mrs. Margaret McNeal 
 Betty Blythe as Madame Arnot 
 Nellie Anderson as Sonia 
 William Calhoun as Thomas Waldron 
 William H. Stucky as Geoffry Blake

References

Bibliography
 Jeff Menne & Christian B. Long. Film and the American Presidency. Routledge, 2015.

External links
 

1918 films
1918 war films
1910s English-language films
American silent feature films
American war films
Films directed by Wilfrid North
American black-and-white films
Vitagraph Studios films
American World War I films
Silent war films
1910s American films